KGRV is a Christian radio station licensed to Winston, Oregon, broadcasting on 700 kHz AM. The station is owned by Pacific Cascade Communications Corporation.

Programming
KGRV's programming consists of Christian talk and teaching, as well as Christian music.  Christian talk and teaching programs heard on KGRV include; Turning Point with David Jeremiah, Thru the Bible with J. Vernon McGee, In Touch with Dr. Charles Stanley, Grace to You with John MacArthur, Focus on the Family, In the Market with Janet Parshall, Insight for Living with Chuck Swindoll, Running to Win with Erwin Lutzer and Unshackled!.

In December 2020 KGRV switched to a full simulcast of KVIP-FM 98.1 Redding, California.

References

External links
KGRV's official website

GRV
Douglas County, Oregon
Radio stations established in 1984
1984 establishments in Oregon